Shirley Horn with Horns is a 1963 studio album by Shirley Horn, featuring arrangements by Quincy Jones, Billy Byers, Thad Jones and Don Sebesky.

Reception

The Allmusic review by Scott Yanow awarded the album three stars and said that "...Horn does not play piano at all, sticking exclusively to vocals, and she had less control over the interpretations (being persuaded to sing some songs at faster-than-usual tempos) than she would later on...although the overall music is enjoyable, Horn would have much preferred to be the pianist behind her own vocals".

Track listing
 "On the Street Where You Live" (Alan Jay Lerner, Frederick Loewe) – 2:15
 "The Great City" (Curtis Reginald Lewis) – 2:02
 "That Old Black Magic" (Harold Arlen, Johnny Mercer) – 2:33
 "Mack the Knife" (Marc Blitzstein, Bertolt Brecht, Kurt Weill) – 3:00
 "Come Dance with Me" (Sammy Cahn, Jimmy Van Heusen) – 2:13
 "Let Me Love You" (Bart Howard) – 3:04
 "After You've Gone" (Henry Creamer, Turner Layton) – 2:59
 "Wouldn't It Be Loverly" (Lerner, Loewe) – 3:39
 "Go Away Little Boy" (Gerry Goffin, Carole King) – 3:26
 "I'm in the Mood for Love" (Dorothy Fields, Jimmy McHugh) – 2:47
 "The Good Life" (Sacha Distel, Jack Reardon) – 3:14
 "In the Wee Small Hours of the Morning" (Bob Hilliard, David Mann) – 3:20

Personnel
Shirley Horn – vocals
Four trumpets
Jimmy Cleveland – trombone
Three trombones
Four French horns
Jimmy Jones – piano
Bobby Scott
Quincy Jones – arranger (tracks 4, 8), conductor 
Billy Byers – arranger (tracks 1, 6–7, 10–12)
Thad Jones – arranger (tracks 2, 5)
Don Sebesky – arranger (tracks 3, 9)

References

1963 albums
Shirley Horn albums
Albums arranged by Quincy Jones
Albums arranged by Billy Byers
Albums arranged by Thad Jones
Albums arranged by Don Sebesky
Albums produced by Quincy Jones
Mercury Records albums